The 1980 Copa Perú season, the promotion tournament of Peruvian football.

In this tournament after many qualification rounds, each one of the 24 departments in which Peru is politically divided, qualify a team. Those teams plus de team relegated from First Division on the last year, enter in two more rounds and finally 6 of them qualify for the Final round, staged in Lima (the capital).

Round robin tournament played in Lima.  Six teams qualified from the Etapa Nacional. For this edition, 7 teams participated as Aguas Verdes (1979 runners-up) were invited to the Final.

The champion was promoted to 1981 Torneo Descentralizado.

Teams
The following list shows the teams that qualified for the National Stage.

National stage

Group I

Group II

Group III

Final stage

Final group stage

Round 1

Round 2

Round 3

Round 4

Round 5

Round 6

Round 7

External links
  Copa Peru 1980
  Semanario Pasión

Copa Perú seasons
Cop